On the Heights (German: Auf der Höhe) is a 1916 Austrian silent drama film directed by Jacob Fleck and Luise Fleck and starring Liane Haid, Hermann Benke and Wilhelm Klitsch.

Cast
 Wilhelm Klitsch as Gregor Stark 
 Liane Haid as Paula 
 Polly Janisch as Helene 
 Hermann Benke as Fabrikant Böllmann 
 Hubert Marischka
 Walter Huber
 Max Neufeld

References

Bibliography
 Parish, Robert. Film Actors Guide. Scarecrow Press, 1977.

External links

Austro-Hungarian films
1916 films
Austrian silent feature films
Austrian drama films
Films directed by Jacob Fleck
Films directed by Luise Fleck
Austrian black-and-white films
1916 drama films
Films based on works by Ludwig Ganghofer
Austrian films based on plays
Silent drama films